An overworld (sometimes referred to as a hub world) is, in a broad sense, commonly an area within a video game that interconnects all its levels or locations. They are mostly common in role-playing games, though this does not exclude other video game genres, such as some platformers and strategy games.

Description
Overworlds generally feature a top-down view or a third-person perspective of the fictional world within the game. It often contains varied terrain (including caves, mountains, forests, and bodies of water) and a collection of towns and other locations (most commonly dungeons or levels). When the party enters one of these locations the world map display may remain on the screen, be replaced by the local geography, or be hidden until the party exits the location. In many games, the player is able to travel on the world map; in other games, the player uses the world map to select their next location. Typically, a dungeon houses a host of enemies, while a town usually is safe. In some games, there are a series of world maps. Some games allow the player to view only a portion of the world map at the beginning of the game, with new locations becoming visible as the game progresses, whereas other games show the entire world map from the beginning. The opposite term "underworld" refers to the world underneath the ground.

Types

Role-playing video games

The Ultima series of RPGs marks one of the first uses of an overworld. Many games have emulated Ultimas overworlds, especially fantasy-based ones. The most prominent example in this category is the Dragon Quest series. In each of this type of overworld game, most of the action (or at least most of the plot-advancing action) takes place in towns, forests, dungeons, caves, castles (and the surrounding area), camps, fortresses, mass transportation systems, celestial bodies (e.g. the moon), and other locations. In the Dragon Quest series, the overworld is used as a "travel map", and changes to a closer perspective for direct gameplay or confrontation. The overworlds featured in most of the 2D adventures of this genre commonly depict the character(s)' proportions as larger than they actually would be in the world being travelled, thus lending necessary visibility to the player. The characters' animation in this type of overworld is often simpler than that found in the game's menus and other areas, while more complicated movement such as combat, climbing or visibly handling objects sometimes happens at closer perspectives, and often involves cutscenes.

The Legend of Zelda series
While previous games have featured overworlds, one of the earliest console games to feature an overworld is the Nintendo Entertainment System game The Legend of Zelda. Gameplay in Zeldas overworld was virtually identical to that of its nine underground dungeon levels, offering a top-down perspective and including access to caves, bridges, mazes, shops and waterfalls as well as lurking dangers that range from enemies to tumbling rocks. Much of the immediate gameplay takes place in the overworld, and the diversity of terrain (as well as the sheer size of the overworld itself) ensures that the player will spend as much time exploring and searching above ground as they will below (or in any of the areas listed above). The concept of an overworld also offered a non-linear gameplay experience; some believed this would cause the player to become confused and not know where to go, a sentiment which has endured as overworlds have become larger and more complex.

The Zelda series is well known for these large overworld areas, such as Hyrule Field. Many enemies inhabit the various overworlds. The player can see most of these without any special tools, and most are easily defeated or avoided. 

There are special items available in most of the overworld areas in the series, but these are often non-essential to completing the overall objective; the main purpose served by an overworld is to connect more important places.

Kid Icarus series
In the Kid Icarus franchise, the Overworld is a name given to the surface of Angel Land that is between the Underworld and the Skyworld.

Platform games
Although large-scale overworlds were popularized by The Legend of Zelda in 1986, the genre of platform games did not have overworlds (in the main sense) until 3D platformers appeared in the mid-1990s. The concept of an overworld in platform gaming prior to that time was limited to a "level select" style, which first was featured in the multi-genre arcade title Dragon Buster, and popularized by other games such as Bionic Commando and Super Mario Bros. 3.
In Spyro the first 3 games had a place called a "home world" that was like an over world. It contained portals to other levels of the game.

Previous titles like Super Mario Bros. and Castlevania revolved around the player completing levels in a linear order, with no option to return to completed levels. It is likely that the overworlds developed for 3D games, such as some of those listed above, evolved from the level-select type overworlds featured in prior 2D platform games, such as those seen in Super Mario Bros. 3 and Donkey Kong Country. Beginning with Super Mario Bros. 3, every Mario platformer has featured either a level-select type overworld (e.g. Super Mario World and New Super Mario Bros.) or a hub-type overworld (e.g. Peach's Castle in Super Mario 64 and the Comet Observatory in Super Mario Galaxy) – a central, usually enemy-free area – that connects to levels and other important places. As the genre evolved and became more popular, the overworld concept expanded into other platformers – from Kirby's Adventure to the Donkey Kong series – becoming a staple of the genre that endures as a prominent feature.

Minecraft
Minecraft is an extremely popular platform and sandbox video game. This game's overworld is a default, meaning the player is situated in the overworld by default,  unless the game is modified. Minecraft's overworld is one of the most popular overworld maps.

Home level

A home level is an area found within a roguelike video game. It is usually a haven for the hero characters, where enemy hostility is minimal. In most cases, the home level features shops in which the player can purchase items, and is often the initial site of the story or game, although in some games it is a location discovered later. In some games, such as Destiny of an Emperor, as the story progresses, the location of the home level may change, or there may be other such places that serve a similar purpose. Larn, a 1980s roguelike game, was among the earliest to feature a home level.

Some games feature a home level that contains many different points of interest. The home level in Angband, for instance, consists of seven shops, the player's home (where characters may store unneeded items), and a staircase to the first dungeon level. Some variants of the home level add speciality shops, quest locations, or a wilderness through which additional towns can be discovered.

Navigation
Many of the games that have an overworld feature a world map of some sort; these range from very basic – such as a grey rectangle with a dot indicating the position of the character in The Legend of Zelda – to an overworld map that can be toggled on and off, but shows only rough outlines of various locations, as well as the character's ever-changing location, such as in later instalments in the Zelda series, or many Final Fantasy games.

Other games, including several instalments in the Ultima and Wasteland series, include detailed, often colourful maps on cloth or paper that came bundled with the game and is meant to be used to navigate while playing the game. Games like Miracle Warriors even came with a little action figure in metal meant to be placed on your position.

Whatever the map style employed (if any), varied world map terrain such as mountains, rivers and deserts may prevent the character(s) from visiting an area until they have completed a certain task or acquired a special skill, vehicle or other key item. Many CRPGs eventually allow the player rapid movement around the overworld, using such methods as flying, sailing, or teleporting to various locations. The map icon is often represented as a rectangle. Usually, flying or sailing across one edge of the map will bring the character(s) to the edge of the opposite side.

In some games, certain areas of the overworld map are hidden from the player, or at least difficult to reach; these "secret" areas often contain difficult-to-obtain items, or they might simply hold "Easter Egg"-style novelties or other such diversions. In some games, especially those that have a "level select" style of overworld (e.g. a lot of old-school 2D platform games), portions of the overworld become available for play as certain tasks are completed (e.g. beating a particular level or discovering a secret hidden within a level).

Audio design
In terms of video game music, overworld themes are often orchestral in nature, and of greater length and complexity than other pieces in the same game, due to the amount of time spent travelling the overworld map. Because players will usually visit a single level or area a few times in a given play session, the music for any such section of the game will typically be shorter and/or less complex, and thus less time-consuming for the designers to produce. The overworld theme frequently functions as a main theme of a game, often used as a motif for other tracks (e.g., a "romance" theme features the main melody of overworld theme, orchestrated in a different key).

See also
 Level
 Level design
 Open world
 Role-playing video game

Footnotes

References

Video game gameplay